Musa Toure is an Australian professional footballer who plays as a forward for Adelaide United. He is the younger brother of Al Hassan and Mohamed Toure. Toure made his A-League Men’s debut against Wellington Phoenix on 9 October 2022

References

External links

2005 births
Adelaide United FC players
Living people
Australian soccer players
Association football forwards